Clemente Biondetti (18 October 1898 – 24 February 1955) was an Italian auto racing driver. Born into a working-class family, Biondetti raced motorcycles before turning to automobiles where he had greater success.

Biography
Born in Buddusò, Sardinia, into a working-class family, Biondetti began his racing career in motorcycles in 1923 but in 1927 turned to automobiles. By 1931 his performance earned him a spot in Grand Prix motor racing with the Maserati factory team.

His success racing on circuits was minimal, but he was one of the best in tough endurance events. Driving an Alfa Romeo 8C 2900b, Clemente Biondetti won the 1938 Mille Miglia for sports cars and at the Coppa Ciano finished second in the voiturette class then third in the main event. In 1939, he won the Coppa Acerbo voiturette class and took second place at the Swiss Grand Prix. His racing career came to a halt following the outbreak of World War II in 1940. By the time he was able to resume racing after the war, he was already 49 years old. Nevertheless, he dominated Italian endurance racing, driving to victory in the Mille Miglia for three straight years from 1947 through 1949 and the Targa Florio in 1948 and 1949. He won more Mille Miglias than any other driver in history.

Clemente Biondetti participated in one Formula One World Championship event, the 1950 Italian Grand Prix. Driving a self-built Ferrari-Jaguar hybrid car, engine problems forced him out of the race thus he failed to score any championship points. Biondetti loved racing cars and continued to compete in sports car and endurance events, earning a second-place finish in a Ferrari at the 12 Hours of Pescara in 1952 against much younger drivers. After suffering from cancer for a number of years, he was forced to retire in 1954. He succumbed to cancer on 24 February 1955 in Florence. As a result, he became the first Formula One World Championship driver to die of natural causes.

Major victories
Coppa Acerbo 1939
Mille Miglia 1938, 1947, 1948, 1949
Targa Florio 1948, 1949

Racing record

Complete European Championship results
(key) (Races in bold indicate pole position; races in italics indicate fastest lap)

Post WWII Grandes Épreuves results
(key) (Races in bold indicate pole position; races in italics indicate fastest lap)

Complete Formula One World Championship results
(key) (Races in bold indicate pole position; races in italics indicate fastest lap)

Complete 24 Hours of Le Mans results

Complete Mille Miglia results

Complete Targa Florio results

References

External links

1898 births
1955 deaths
People from the Province of Sassari
Italian racing drivers
Italian Formula One drivers
Grand Prix drivers
24 Hours of Le Mans drivers
World Sportscar Championship drivers
Sportspeople from Sardinia
European Championship drivers
Deaths from cancer in Tuscany